Chartiers Houston High School is located in Washington County, Pennsylvania, USA.

It consists of three schools, the Allison Park Elementary (K-5)  Chartiers Houston Middle School (6-8) And  Chartiers Houston High School (9-12) that has 550 students... a total district enrollment of 1,145.
The Chartiers Houston School District's mascot is the Buccaneer. The school is attended by students who live in Chartiers Township and Houston Borough.

References

Public elementary schools in Pennsylvania
Public high schools in Pennsylvania
Public middle schools in Pennsylvania
Schools in Washington County, Pennsylvania